Li Yuan is the personal name of Emperor Gaozu of Tang, founder of the Tang dynasty.

Li Yuan or Yuan Li may also refer to:

People surnamed Li
Li Yuan (ROC politician) (1879–after 1935), Chinese politician and mayor of Beiping between 1925 and 1927
Li Yuan (PRC general) (1917–2008), Chinese general and politician
Hsiao Yeh (born 1951), born Li Yuan, Taiwanese writer
Li Yuan (snooker player) (born 1989), Chinese snooker player
Li Yuan (basketball) (born 2000), Chinese basketball player

People surnamed Yuan
 Yuan Li (born 1973), Chinese actress
 Yuan Li (fencer) (born 1978), Chinese female fencer

See also
Liyuan (disambiguation)
Yuanli, Miaoli, a township in Miaoli, Taiwan